Vattigudipadu is a village in Eluru district of the Indian state of Andhra Pradesh. It is located in Agiripalli mandal.

See also 
Villages in Agiripalli mandal

References 

Villages in Eluru district